Sultan Kot railway station is located in Sultan Kot village, Shikarpur district of Sindh province of the Pakistan.

See also
 List of railway stations in Pakistan
 Pakistan Railways

References

Railway stations in Shikarpur District
Railway stations on Rohri–Chaman Railway Line
Railway stations on Kotri–Attock Railway Line (ML 2)
Railway stations in Sindh